Chalcidoptera argyrophoralis is a moth in the family Crambidae. It was described by George Hampson in 1912. It is found in Ghana.

References

Endemic fauna of Ghana
Moths described in 1912
Spilomelinae